Colombelles is a commune in the Calvados department in the Normandy region in northwestern France.

It is located on the Canal de Caen à la Mer.

Population
The population of this sleepy little village mushroomed after August Thyssen bought some land in 1909 and established a steel mill there.

International relations
Colombelles is twinned with Fremington, Devon (UK) since 1983 and with Steinheim am Albuch (Baden-Württemberg, Germany) since 1986 (see that article in German).

See also
Société Métallurgique de Normandie
Communes of the Calvados department

References

Communes of Calvados (department)
Calvados communes articles needing translation from French Wikipedia